Jane Dutton is a South African broadcast journalist, who worked for Al Jazeera English.

Career
eNCA
In July 2018 Jane joined eNCA  presenting her show Tonight with Jane Dutton in the 8pm weekday slot which is broadcast from Johannesburg.
Al Jazeera English
Jane was with Al Jazeera from September 2005, in the run-up to the launch of the station, until June 29, 2018, when she left to return to South Africa.

She was based at the main broadcast-centre, in Doha in Qatar. Due to family commitments, she later specialised in studio-based journalism. She was one of the key anchors at the station and her work ranged from news-reading, to hosting studio-based interview programmes and to voice-overs and continuity.

As a news-correspondent, Jane covered stories in the United States, in Europe and in her native Africa, from South Africa to Egypt.

As the host of studio-based talk-shows, Jane was a regular host of Inside Story, the daily programme that analyses a topical issue from the news, with the aid of guests from inside and outside the country in question. She was also a host for the weekly programme Inside Syria, that analyses recent developments in the war-torn country.

For the strand Talk to Al Jazeera, Jane travelled to interview the famously camera-shy President of Eritrea, Isaias Afewerki, his country's sole head of state since independence in 1991. The interview is an internet favourite as the response to most of the questions was to denounce them as lies, without offering clarification or elaboration.

CNBC
Previously, Jane worked for CNBC in London.

CNN
Prior to that, Jane worked for CNN, contributing to news programmes.

Early career
Jane began her career with SABC, but has also worked for eTV. She became an SABC correspondent in London, where she later worked for BBC World.

Personal life
Education
Jane was educated at St Mary's School, Waverley, Johannesburg.

Family
Jane is the mother of two children.

References

Living people
White South African people
South African journalists
BBC newsreaders and journalists
Al Jazeera people
CNBC people
CNN people
Alumni of St Mary's School, Waverley
Year of birth missing (living people)